The American Samoa women's national under-17 football team is the second highest women's youth team of women's football in American Samoa and is controlled by the Football Federation American Samoa, the governing body of the sport in the territory.

History
American Samoa never participated in the OFC U-17 Women's Championship so far. However, in 2017 they will participate for the first time.

OFC Championship Record

Current technical staff

Current squad
The following players were called up for the 2017 OFC U-16 Women's Championship

Caps and goals correct after match against Tonga on August 11, 2017.

List of Coaches
  Ruth Tuato'o (2017-

See also
 American Samoa women's national football team
 American Samoa men's national football team
 American Samoa men's national under-23 football team
 American Samoa men's national under-20 football team
 American Samoa men's national under-17 football team

References

External links
American Samoa Football Federation page
Oceania Football Federation page

Women's national under-17 association football teams
Football in American Samoa
women's
Women in American Samoa